Charles E. Marks (1875-1926) was a skilled carpenter who later became a general contractor in Madison, Wisconsin in the early twentieth century.  Using mostly his personal designs, he built homes in the Prairie School design and American Craftsman style. He built many important buildings and homes in the Madison, Wisconsin area.

Madison, Wisconsin Buildings 

 Samuel Moore House, 112 Lathrop Street (built 1912; on the National Register of Historic Places since 1982)
 Charles and Minerva Marks House, Jefferson St (built 1905; on the National Register of Historic Places since 1999)
 Charles H. and Caroline Mills House, Jefferson St (built 1915; on the National Register of Historic Places since 1999)
 E.A. Brown / Charles and Minerva Marks House, Jefferson St (built 1911; on the National Register of Historic Places since 1999)

He was instrumental in development of area of College Hills Historic District in Madison, which includes a number of houses that he designed and/or built.

References 

https://npgallery.nps.gov/GetAsset/a625f156-8a38-4d5a-a30c-03731662b759 Biography in National Register of Historic Places
https://web.archive.org/web/20131029195437/http://www.cityofmadison.com/planning/landmark/Greenbush%20Vilas%20Walking%20Tour.pdf, Greenbush Walking Tour, Heggland and Rankin, 1991, City of Madison
https://web.archive.org/web/20131029194505/http://www.cityofmadison.com/planning/landmark/Univ%20Hts%20Walking%20Tour.pdf, University Heights Walking Tour, Heggland and Rankin, 1987, City of Madison
https://peoplelegacy.com/charles_e_marks-1V4.0I Gravesite

External links
 "Historic Madison Walking Tours", City of Madison
 "Wisconsin Historical Society", Madison, Wisconsin

1875 births
Year of death unknown
American carpenters